Who's Minding the Store? is a 1963 American comedy film directed by Frank Tashlin and starring Jerry Lewis, Jill St. John, Agnes Moorehead, Ray Walston, Kathleen Freeman, and John McGiver.  It was released on November 28, 1963, by Paramount Pictures.

Plot
Rich Mrs. Phoebe Tuttle is upset that her daughter Barbara is engaged to a man beneath their social stature, Norman Phiffier. Barbara has been keeping her heiress status to the Tuttle Department Store fortune a secret from Phiffier, knowing he is a proud person who refuses to marry her until he can afford to buy her a home.

Phiffier, a dog walker, is as awkward socially as he is physically. Mrs. Tuttle despises Phiffier but arranges for him to get a job at one of her stores. She directs the store manager, Quimby, to assign Phiffier a series of impossible and outrageous tasks, hoping he will become frustrated and quit, proving to her daughter that he is worthless. Instead, even though he suffers a series of hilarious mishaps, Phiffier becomes more driven and determined, and Quimby realizes that "he's a man of character". Phiffier also meets and befriends John Tuttle, Phoebe's henpecked husband, with neither suspecting each other's true identity.

After a final spectacular failure involving a super-strong vacuum cleaner and a dog trapped inside it, Barbara's identity as an heiress is revealed. Disappointed by the Tuttles' deception, Phiffier breaks off the engagement and quits, returning to his previous job as dog walker. In this way he finally proves his worth to Mrs. Tuttle, and after she, John and Barbara temporarily join the dog-walking service to deliver their apologies to Phiffier, he and the Tuttles reconcile.

Cast 
 Jerry Lewis as Norman Phiffier
 Jill St. John as Barbara Tuttle
 Ray Walston as Mr. Quimby
 John McGiver as Mr. John P. Tuttle
 Agnes Moorehead as Mrs. Phoebe Tuttle
 Francesca Bellini as Shirley Lott
 Peggy Mondo as Lady wrestler
 Nancy Kulp as Emily Rothgraber
 John Abbott as Mr. Orlandos
 Isobel Elsom as Hazel, a Dowager
 Kathleen Freeman as Mrs. Glucksman
 Fritz Feld as Irving Cahastrophe, the Gourmet Manager
 Milton Frome as Francois, the Driver
 Mary Treen as Mattress Customer
 Dick Wessel as Traffic Cop (credited as Richard Wessel)

French actor Christopher Lambert appeared in an uncredited role in this movie.

Production
Who's Minding the Store? was filmed from March 25 to May 22, 1963.

The scene in which Fritz Feld feeds Lewis a delicacy of fried ants actually contained genuine fried ants, a fact that Lewis was unaware of until after the scene was over.

Reception
On Rotten Tomatoes, the film holds a 40% rating based on 5 reviews, with an average rating of 4.80/10.

Home media
The film was released on DVD and Blu-ray Disc on March 27, 2012.

Legacy
The film's poster can be seen in the background of Jerry's film, The Patsy when Ina Balin gets into a phone booth to call Jerry's character, Stanley Belt.
Part of the musical score from the typewriter scene ("The Typewriter" by Leroy Anderson) was used as a title theme for the German comedy series Büro, Büro.
"The Typewriter" sequence became a regular part of Lewis' live stage repertoire and he performed it frequently when hosting The Muscular Dystrophy Telethon.

See also
List of American films of 1963

References

External links 
 
 

1963 films
1960s English-language films
1963 comedy films
American comedy films
Films directed by Frank Tashlin
Films set in department stores
Films with screenplays by Frank Tashlin
Paramount Pictures films
1960s American films